Ion Luchianov (Ivan Lukyanov; born 31 January 1981 in Slobozia-Duşca, Criuleni) is a male steeplechaser from Moldova. He competed for his native country at the 2004 Summer Olympics in Athens, Greece, where he finished ninth in his heat of the 3000 metres steeplechase therefore missing out on a place in the final. At the 2008 Summer Olympics in Beijing, China he finished 12th in the final. At the 2012 Summer Olympics in London, Great Britain, he finished tenth in the final.

He changed his sporting nationality in December 2013, choosing to compete for Russia over his native Moldova. He became eligible to represent Russia internationally in May 2014.

Competition record

References

External links

1981 births
Living people
People from Criuleni District
Moldovan male middle-distance runners
Moldovan male long-distance runners
Russian male middle-distance runners
Russian male long-distance runners
Russian male steeplechase runners
Athletes (track and field) at the 2004 Summer Olympics
Athletes (track and field) at the 2008 Summer Olympics
Athletes (track and field) at the 2012 Summer Olympics
Olympic athletes of Moldova
World Athletics Championships athletes for Moldova
Moldovan male steeplechase runners
Universiade medalists in athletics (track and field)
Universiade gold medalists for Moldova
Universiade silver medalists for Moldova
Universiade bronze medalists for Moldova
Medalists at the 2009 Summer Universiade
Medalists at the 2005 Summer Universiade
Medalists at the 2007 Summer Universiade